is a private women's college in Kita-ku, Kobe, Japan. The predecessor of the school was founded in 1886, and it was chartered as a university in 1966.

History

1887: "Sinwa Woman's school" was established.
1887: Sinwa Girls’ School is founded in ZENSHOUJI of Kobe Motomachi.
1892: The Sinwa Girls' School closed but later reopened through the efforts of Haruko Tomokuni.
1896: New schoolhouse is completed in 7-chome, Shimoyamate.
1908: The school changed its name to "Shinwa Girls’ High School".
1947: Junior school education of the school starts. The school name became “Shinwa Girls’ Junior School”.
1966: Shinwa Women's College (Department of Literature - "Japanese literature department" and "English Literature Section") open learning.
1972: Department of Literature “Child Educational Research Section” was establishment.
1987: 100th anniversary
1994: Department of Literature educational major.
2005: Department of Literature
2006: Shinwa Women's College commemorates its 40th anniversary.
2008: Department of Literature Junior sports Educational Research.

Subjects

Department of Literature(Synthetic sentence Chemistry Section)
Child Educational Research Section
Psychology department
Welfare clinical subject
Junior sports Educational Research Section

Alumnae

Model and actress Norika Fujiwara graduated from Shinwa girls' high school and Kobe Shinwa Women's University.

External links
 Official website 

Educational institutions established in 1887
Private universities and colleges in Japan
Universities and colleges in Hyōgo Prefecture
1887 establishments in Japan